Caffe may refer to:
 Caffè, the Italian word for coffee, used as an alternative spelling of café
 Caffe (software), a library for deep learning

See also
 Caffa (disambiguation)